Leandro Luis Desábato (born March 30, 1990) is an Argentine footballer who played as a midfielder.

Career
Desábato starter his professional career playing for Vélez Sarsfield entering the field in a 1–0 victory over Lanús for the 2010 Clausura tournament. Leandro was part of the squads that won the 2011 Clausura (playing three games), the 2012 Inicial (playing two games), the 2012–13 Superfinal and the 2013 Supercopa Argentina. He scored his first goal for the team in a 4–1 victory against Atlético de Rafaela, on September 23, 2013.

Personal life
He is the twin brother of Andrés Desábato and cousin of Leandro Desábato, both of whom are also professional footballers.

Honours
Vélez Sarsfield
Argentine Primera División: 2011 Clausura, 2012 Inicial, 2012–13 Superfinal.
Supercopa Argentina: 2013

Individual
 Campeonato Carioca Team of the year: 2018

References

External links
 Profile at Vélez Sarsfield's official website 
 
 
 
 
 

Living people
1990 births
Argentine footballers
Association football midfielders
Argentine expatriate footballers
Club Atlético Vélez Sarsfield footballers
CR Vasco da Gama players
Cerezo Osaka players
Vegalta Sendai players
Argentine Primera División players
J1 League players
J2 League players
Expatriate footballers in Brazil
Footballers from Santa Fe, Argentina